Insitor was, in Ancient Roman religion, a minor agricultural deity involved with the sowing of crops. His name was invoked during the Cerealia, along with the other 11 helper gods of Ceres.

References

Agricultural gods
Helper gods of Ceres